Laurence Carl "Larry" Rickard (born 14 June 1975) is an English actor, writer, and comedian best known as a member of the British Horrible Histories troupe (in which he appears in the TV series Horrible Histories), Yonderland and Ghosts. He is also one half of the comedy writing/performance duo "Larry and George" with George Sawyer. Along with Ben Willbond, he co-wrote the 2022 feature length television comedy We Are Not Alone.

Career
Rickard has written for numerous UK comedy shows, notably including The Armstrong and Miller Show, The Charlotte Church Show and The Impressions Show with Culshaw and Stephenson, as well as children's programme Me and My Monsters.

He is perhaps best known for his role as a principal cast member, lyricist and writer for the award-winning CBBC programme Horrible Histories, in particular for creating and performing the character of 'Special Correspondent' Bob Hale (a parody of presenter Peter Snow). He has also appeared regularly on the spin-off game show Horrible Histories: Gory Games and in the Horrible Histories BBC Proms at the Royal Albert Hall.

Along with the five other members of the Horrible Histories starring cast, Rickard is also the co-creator, writer, and star of Yonderland, a family/fantasy/comedy series that premiered on SkyOne on 10 November 2013.  A second series was released in 2015 and a third has since been commissioned and began filming in early 2016. In addition he is the co-writer of Bill, a BBC-produced comedy film which is based loosely around the early life of William Shakespeare and involves the same starring troupe.  Filming took place in 2014, and the film had a nationwide UK release in September 2015.

As a performer he has also appeared in the Channel Four Comedy Lab 'Private Lives' as well as the TV series Balls of Steel.

He is also a writer and performer on Tracey Ullman's Show and Tracey Breaks the News. While he has played numerous roles on the shows, his most recent recurring role is that of Philip May, the husband of former British Prime Minister Theresa May.

He co-created, writes, and stars in the 2019 BBC sitcom Ghosts.

Awards

References

External links

1975 births
English television writers
English male stage actors
English male television actors
Living people
People from Brighton
British male television writers